Berton Wesley Klaasen is a South African rugby union player who last played for the  in the Pro14. His usual position is centre.

References

Living people
1990 births
South African rugby union players
Western Province (rugby union) players
Rugby union centres
People from Somerset West
Southern Kings players
Eastern Province Elephants players
Griquas (rugby union) players
Rugby union players from the Western Cape